The Setmana Ciclista Valenciana is an annual professional road bicycle race for women in Spain.

Winners

Classification leaders jerseys

References

Cycle races in Spain
Recurring sporting events established in 2017
2017 establishments in the Valencian Community
Women's road bicycle races
Annual sporting events in Spain